The Female Furies are a group of women warriors and supervillains appearing in comics published by DC Comics. All of them are New Gods who serve Darkseid. They operate directly under Granny Goodness, who trains all of Darkseid's soldiers.

Publication history
The Female Furies first appeared in Mister Miracle #6 (February 1972) and were created by Jack Kirby.

In November 2018, the Female Furies headlined their own six-issue miniseries by writer Cecil Castellucci and artist Adriana Melo.

Fictional team history
The Female Furies are New Gods fanatically loyal to Darkseid. They have been trained by Granny Goodness to serve as Apokolips's elite strike force. Infighting among the Furies is commonplace, most typically to appoint a leader to the group.

After former leader Big Barda defected to Earth to be with her lover, Mister Miracle, Darkseid gave a kill order on the pair, prompting the rest of the Female Furies to strike. First, Mad Harriet and Stompa ambushed Barda but vanished after weakening her. Shortly after, Barda found and grabbed Lashina before she was able to attack, though Lashina escaped Barda's grip. A fight quickly ensued, though Lashina teleported away when Barda managed to defeat her. After tracking down a Mother Box to Funky Flashman's residence, the Furies, this time with Bernadeth, appeared. Realizing that they had been tricked, the Furies destroyed the house, though Funky Flashman managed to escape by throwing his assistant at the warriors. Having failed to kill either Barda or Mister Miracle, the Furies returned to Apokolips.

Later, Barda had traveled back to Apokolips and recruited dozens of Female Furies to help her rescue the captured Mister Miracle. Gilotina seduced and killed the guard, allowing the other Furies to storm Section Zero. Elsewhere, Lashina took the section director's post to discover where Mister Miracle was held captive. The Furies ambushed Granny Goodness, who had been holding a viewing party for Mister Miracle's trial by combat with a mysterious creature called the Lump. Bernadeth held the assassin Kanto at bay with her Fahren-knife, while an enraged Barda nearly killed Granny Goodness until she learned Mister Miracle had survived. Reunited, Barda and Mister Miracle, along with Bernadeth, Lashina, Stompa, and Mad Harriet, returned to Earth.

On Earth, the Furies had little time to relax as they were soon incapacitated by the World Protective League. When they awoke, they found themselves trapped in a cage behind thick glass. They easily escaped due to Mad Harriet's claws and Stompa's boots. They also freed Mike McCracken of the All-Nations Agency. They were soon ambushed by a security patrol, though the Furies easily disposed of them. The Furies helped to defeat the Head of the World Protective League, and Mike McCracken sabotaged the building so that it would blow up in four hours. After retrieving her mega-rod, Barda teleported the group to safety.

While on Earth, the Furies, without Mad Harriet, participated in Mister Miracle's tricks, using their weapons to show great feats by the escape artist. They also joined in the battle against Doctor Bedlam and his animates. The group was next seen at the beach where they thrash some marines for interrupting their leisure swimming. Lashina and Stompa later helped Barda and Ted Brown clear up a new location for Mister Miracle's act. Orion later mentioned that Lashina and the Furies had been called to join New Genesis in the war against Apokolips.

Under unknown circumstances, the Female Furies left Barda on Earth and returned to Apokolips where they were temporarily assigned to command a unit of automated battle machines as punishment for their defection. The Furies attempted to revolt, but they were subdued along with Granny Goodness by Apokoloptian soldiers with electric jolts.

The Female Furies eventually regained Darkseid's trust, and he assigned them the task of retrieving Glorious Godfrey from Belle Reve Penitentiary. He appointed Lashina as new leader of the Furies, though Desaad tried to convince the ruler to appoint his sister Bernadeth in the position. The Furies traveled to Earth and broke into the prison, battling various members of the Suicide Squad and easily capturing their target. As the Furies opened a Boom Tube to return to Apokolips, Bernadeth betrayed Lashina, leaving her for dead on Earth. Lashina briefly took the codename Duchess and joined the Suicide Squad until she was able to find a way to return to her planet.

Lashina recruited several members of the Squad into helping her return to Apokolips, and kidnapped several others (including Big Barda). When they arrived on Apokolips, the Suicide Squad battled through waves of Parademons. They were soon after confronted by the Female Furies and other members of Darkseid's Elite. During the battle, Stompa battled Vixen but ended up getting defeated by Barda. Mad Harriet fought and defeated Shade, the Changing Man by using his own energies against him. Newcomer Artemiz and her Cyberpak battled Nightshade, though the Fury suffered defeat. Bernadeth waited until Lashina had exhausted herself battling others, then struck her with her dagger. However, Lashina eventually defeated Bernadeth and killed her by snapping her neck. Granny Goodness ended the battle and welcomed Lashina back to the Furies's ranks. When asked what they should do with the remaining members of the Suicide Squad, Lashina replied: "Let's just kill them". Before they were able to finish off the Squad, the Forever People appeared with the Suicide Squad members that had remained on Earth. Their interference allowed Big Barda and the other captives to fight back, though the battle came to an end when Darkseid appeared. Enraged that Lashina had brought humans to Apokolips, he revived Bernadeth and used his Omega Beams to disintegrate Lashina. He then revived the fallen Suicide Squad members and allowed them to leave Apokolips.

Much later, Granny Goodness held a combat demonstration at her orphanage, displaying Bernadeth, Stompa, Mad Harriet, and Artemiz as they battled a group of Series-9 Drones. The demonstration was interrupted by Darkseid, who revealed Mister Miracle had returned to Apokolips, and he wanted the Furies to kill him. He revived Lashina, though as punishment he kept Bernadeth as leader. The Furies managed to quickly defeat Mister Miracle and deliver him to Darkseid's throne room. After his comrades aided his escape, Mister Miracle defeated the Female Furies using his miracle mister soap.

A second wave of Female Furies, including long-time member Gilotina, Malice Vundabar, Bloody Mary, and Speed Queen, later appeared and went on a killing spree, but were stopped by Hawk and Dove.

The Furies made an appearance as antagonists in Grant Morrison's acclaimed Seven Soldiers event, specifically in the Seven Soldiers: Mister Miracle mini-series. Here, they are all given human forms along with Darkseid and his other minions, with the Furies all becoming prostitutes with Granny Goodness acting as their pimp. They attempt to entice Shilo Norman, the second Mr. Miracle when he arrives at the Dark Side Club searching for Darkseid himself. They knock Shilo out, and then stuff him in the trunk of a car while he is bound and gagged, eventually torturing and setting him ablaze in a forest. This is later revealed to be a horrid illusion brought about by Darkseid's Omega Sanction.

They are later shown aiding Granny in her scheme to overthrow the Greek Gods, kidnapping Dr. Helena Sandsmark to antagonize her daughter Wonder Girl during the events of her solo mini-series. After the deaths of Mister Miracle and Metron during the Death of the New Gods, the Source stated Darkseid was the only remaining New God. The only Furies who were not visibly killed, currently, are Lashina, Stompa, Gilotina, Malice, Wunda, and Artemiz; although at the end of Death of the New Gods it is reiterated that all the New Gods are dead. While the New Gods were being killed off, Granny Goodness orchestrated the Amazon-American war to pose as Queen Hippolyta to train women (such as Harley Quinn and Holly Robinson) under the auspices of becoming Amazon warriors into new Female Furies. This seems to conflict directly with Terror Titans, where Lashina (in her human form), is shown to be one of the villains running the Dark Side Club with the Clock King. She is last seen being electrocuted into unconsciousness by Static, who then presumably turns her over to the authorities with the rest of the upper level Dark Side Club players.

After the end of the Fourth World, in the Final Crisis, the corrupted Mary Marvel released the Anti-Life Equation and creates new Female Furies from Earth's heroines and villainesses, including Wonder Woman, Catwoman, Giganta and Batwoman.

The New 52
In 2011, The New 52 rebooted the continuity of the DC universe and introduced a brand new Fury named Sweet Leilani. Granny Goodness sent Leilani to Earth to retrieve a Mother Box. She discovered that it was in the new O.M.A.C.'s possession. After a battle, Leilani was defeated and quickly retreated, vowing to return with the other Female Furies. Under unknown circumstances, Sweet Leilani left Darkseid's employ along with teammates Enchanthrax, Killsandra, and Thumpa, and formed the Femmes Fatales. Together, they joined the Cult of Yuga Khan. The cult's leader, Aagog, sent the Femmes Fatales to Earth to capture Beautiful Dreamer of the Forever People in hopes to resurrect Yuga Khan. After suffering defeat by the Forever People, the unconscious Femmes Fatales were gathered by Lashina and Granny Goodness, the latter of whom mentioned that a war was approaching and that "all they need is the kind of love only Granny can give".

During the Darkseid War, Lashina and Kanto went to Earth in search of the amazon Myrina Black, who had given birth to Darkseid's child, Grail. After Darkseid's death, Lashina, Kanto, and Kalibak encountered Wonder Woman, Mr. Miracle, and several other heroes. The New Gods were close to defeating the heroes until Big Barda appeared, which drove the villains back. Barda proposed a peace treaty with Lashina, but Lashina refused, declaring that the Furies would never stop hunting her down.

Later, Barda returned to Apokolips and made a pact with the Furies: Barda would return to the group if they helped her defeat Grail and protect Mr. Miracle. While Grail and the newly revived, enslaved Darkseid were about to defeat Wonder Woman, Mr. Miracle, and the other heroes, Barda appeared through a boom tube alongside Lashina, Stompa, Bernadeth, Mad Harriet, Steppenwolf, Kalibak, and Kanto. Working together with the heroes, the Furies were able to defeat Grail and separate Darkseid from the Anti-Life Equation. In the ensuing explosion, Darkseid and Grail both vanish. Big Barda revealed the truth to Mr. Miracle and left with the other Furies back to Apokolips.

DC Rebirth
After the events of the "Darkseid War" storyline that led to "DC Rebirth", Lex Luthor became ruler of Apokolips. Granny Goodness, along with the Furies, remained loyal to Darkseid, and awaited his return on the outskirts of Apokolips. A Mother Box later mysteriously teleported Lois Lane to Apokolips. Granny Goodness, along with Lashina, Stompa, and Mad Harriet, as well as several other unnamed Furies, took Lois captive. However, after being ambushed by a Dredge Worm, Lois managed to win over the Furies by aiding them in battle. Granny invited Lois to join the Furies and replace a fallen Fury. When a different Fury opposed Lois joining, Granny reminded her of Alianna Hubbard, the first human to join their ranks. Later, Granny offered Lois Lane some cooked meat and reminded her that the Furies are family.

Granny Goodness and the Furies, with Lois, then made their way for the main citadel of Apokolips. Along the way, they discovered Kalibak, who had captured Superman and Lex Luthor. When Granny Goodness scolded Kalibak, he attacked, and a battle between the Furies and Kalibak's forces ensued. During the battle, Lois Lane rescued Superman, who attacked Kalibak. Before he could be defeated, Kalibak used his machine to absorb the fires from Apokolips. This severely weakened Superman, though the battle escalated when Superman's son rode in on the Hunger Dogs of Apokolips.

As the battle raged on, Lashina and Mad Harriet attacked Superman while Granny fought Kalibak. When Lois Lane jumped to Superman's defense, the Furies turned on her, claiming that by caring for a man she was belittling the progress that the Furies had made. Lois managed to defeat the Furies with her spear. Later, Lashina, Stompa, and Mad Harriet were seen dressed in rags in a prison cell after Superman took leadership of Apokolips.

Later, Darkseid freed the Female Furies under unknown circumstances. He sent the Furies, now with Bernadeth and Gilotina, to Turkey in search of his missing artifacts. This led to a confrontation with Wonder Woman's lover Steve Trevor and his team, the Oddfellows.

The Oddfellows somehow managed to defeat the Furies, capturing both Lashina and Mad Harriet. Bernadeth, Stompa, and Gilotina reported back to Darkseid without the relics. Furious, Darkseid threatened to kill the trio, though he explained he still had use for them. Both Lashina and Mad Harriet refused to answer Wonder Woman's questioning about Darkseid's plans which led to Wonder Woman freeing the two Furies and attempting to battle them for answers. The battle was interrupted by Darkseid, who had transported a chunk of the A.R.G.U.S. headquarters to his lair in the Amazon jungle. In the ensuing chaos, the Female Furies battled the soldiers of A.R.G.U.S. and later fled when Darkseid was apparently killed by Wonder Woman.

Later, the Furies attended the birth of Mister Miracle's and Big Barda's child Jacob. Bernadeth allowed Mister Miracle to borrow her Fahren-Knife to cut the newborn free from Barda's indestructible umbilical cord. Months later, Bernadeth attended the conference to discuss peace between Apokolips and New Genesis.

At some point, Granny Goodness had taken interest in Harley Quinn. While Quinn was on vacation, Granny sent Lashina and Bernadeth to recruit the anti-heroine into the Female Furies. She later assigned her to capture the escaped prisoner and former Fury, Petite Tina. Harley Quinn eventually failed as a Female Fury, and she and Tina were captured and tortured by Bernadeth. Harley was immune to Bernadeth's mind-wiping machine, and she and Petite Tina escaped Apokolips to return to Earth.

Membership

Core members

Later additions

Femmes Fatales
An offshoot of the Female Furies, these four women defected and joined the Cult of Yuga Khan. They were later retrieved by Granny Goodness and presumably returned to the Furies' ranks.

Other versions

Amalgam Comics
In the Marvel/DC crossover series Unlimited Access #1-4 in the Amalgam Comics, the Furies appear as part of the New Gods. Only two of the Furies are merged with Marvel characters: Lashina and the Scarlet Witch merge to become Red Lash, and Stompa and the Blob merge to become Blobba. Bernadeth and Mad Harriet are also seen in the series, though they are not merged with any Marvel characters.

Flashpoint
In the Flashpoint reality, the Furies are assembled by Wonder Woman who asks Arrowette, Cheetah, Cheshire, Giganta, Hawkgirl, Huntress, Katana, Lady Vic, Silver Swan, Starfire, Terra, and Vixen to join her.

Ame-Comi Girls
In the Ame-Comi universe, the Female Furies are space pirates led by Big Barda. The team consists of Barda, Stompa, Mad Harriet, Lashina, Bloody Mary, and Speed Queen.

Sensation Comics Featuring Wonder Woman
The Female Furies appear in the story "Dig For Fire", where they discover that Wonder Woman has traveled to Apokolips. Together, Lashina, Stompa, and Mad Harriet defeat Wonder Woman and throw her to her death into the fire pits. Wonder Woman survives, and later battles the Furies once again (this time with Bernadeth as well), though Darkseid ends the battle and allows Wonder Woman to travel home.

Scooby-Doo! Team-Up
Bernadeth, Lashina, Stompa, and Mad Harriet appear in "The Greater Escape" from the Scooby-Doo! Team-Up crossover series. Granny Goodness also recruits Daphne Blake and Velma Dinkley into the Female Furies after wiping their minds.

Female Furies miniseries
Big Barda, Lashina, Bernadeth, Stompa, and Mad Harriet appear as the protagonists of the Female Furies six-issue miniseries. Set in an alternate universe, the Furies attempt to overcome sexism and misogyny on Apokolips, eventually driving Darkseid and his forces off of the planet and leaving women to rule. Aurelie, Sweet Leilani, Gilotina, and Giganta also appear throughout the story.

In other media

Television
 Lashina, Stompa, and Mad Harriet appeared in the Superman: The Animated Series two-part episode "Little Girl Lost" with Lashina voiced by Diane Michelle, Stompa by Diane Delano, and Mad Harriet by Andrea Martin. In an attempt to prove herself to Superman by challenging Intergang with the help of Jimmy Olsen, Supergirl unwittingly stumbles upon Granny Goodness' connections with Apokolips. After trashing Intergang, Kara so inspires the wrath of Granny Goodness that the latter summons the Furies to personally annihilate Supergirl. In part 2, the Female Furies defeat Supergirl and then Superman, who attempts to save her. Bringing Superman to Apokolips for Darkseid, the Furies again battle Supergirl, in which they are eventually defeated one-by-one. They also appeared in the series finale "Legacy" where at least Lashina had a relationship with Superman when he was brainwashed by Darkseid. Notably when Superman returned to Apokolips to exact revenge against Darkseid and Granny Goodness, he merely asked Lashina to get out of his way. The Female Furies preferred to fight Superman, but he defeated them by crashing into a fiery pillar.
 The Furies appeared in the Justice League Unlimited episode "Alive". With Bernadeth seen as a member, the Female Furies serve Granny Goodness in her power struggle against Virman Vundabar and his lieutenants Kanto and Mantis. Shortly afterwards, a resurrected Darkseid (following his death at the end of the Justice League episode Twilight) returns and puts an end to the war.
 Stompa and Lashina appeared in the Batman: The Brave and the Bold episode "Duel of the Double Crossers!" with Lashina voiced by Nika Futterman while Stompa has no dialogue. They appear as combatants on Warworld, under the command of Mongal as her "Furies".
 The Female Furies appeared in the tenth and final season of Smallville in episode "Abandoned" with Mad Harriet portrayed by Lindsay Hartley. The Female Furies are presumably led by the commanding officer Harriet that answers to Granny Goodness, who is one of the Unholy Trinity of Darkseid's Prophets-Minions; the other two are Club Owner Desaad and Gordon Godfrey. Granny Goodness created the Female Furies out of young girls who came to her orphanage and were wiped clean of their memories and turned into warrior women who Granny Goodness would use for the coming war of Light and Darkness. Tesa Mercer was also in the orphanage as a child before she was removed by her father Lionel Luthor. When Clark investigates Granny's orphanage he found several women fighting and as he approached them he started to weaken and found they were forging Green Kryptonite weapons and the women warriors easily subdue Clark and chain him near to a Green Kryptonite fire forge. Clark tries to convince the Furies and Harriet to be free from Granny and Darkseid, but Harriet responds that Granny Goodness is their family and that she will prepare and make them stronger. Granny then arrives and tells Harriet and the Furies to stop torturing Clark and commands Harriet to take her sisters away to their rooms. After Clark avoided having his memories wiped completely by freezing a Kryptonite chain above a forge of Green Meteor rocks, Clark super-speeds to save Tess from Harriet and another Fury warrior. Clark and Tess defeat Harriet and the Fury and escape from Granny's orphanage.
 Big Barda, Stompa, Mad Harriet, Artemiz, and Speed Queen appear in the DC Super Hero Girls TV special "Super Hero High" with Big Barda and Mad Harriet voiced by Misty Lee, Stompa by April Stewart, Artemiz by Teala Dunn, and Speed Queen by Mae Whitman.
 Big Barda, Stompa, Mad Harriet, Artemiz, Lashina and Speed Queen appear in the web series DC Super Hero Girls with Big Barda and Mad Harriet voiced again by Misty Lee, Stompa by April Stewart, Artemiz by Teala Dunn, Lashina by Jessica DiCicco, and Speed Queen by Mae Whitman again for her first appearances and Ashlyn Selich for her second appearances. Granny Goodness leads the team, while Barda eventually leaves them.
 The Female Furies appear in Justice League Action, with Granny Goodness being voiced by Cloris Leachman while Bernadeth and Lashina have no dialogue.
 Big Barda, Lashina, and Gilotina appear in the Young Justice episode "Influence". Barda is voiced by Grey Griffin, while Lashina and Gilotina have no dialogue. The three Furies attack Superman, Wonder Woman, and Hawkwoman for Granny. When Granny and Desaad test their Ghost Machine on heroes and Furies alike, Barda is stunned when the heroes rescue her and her fellow Furies. At the end of the episode "Death and Rebirth", Darkseid recruits Black Mary and Supergirl into the Furies.

Film
 The Female Furies appear in Superman/Batman: Apocalypse. The Furies that appear in the film include Gilotina and Mad Harriet (both by Salli Saffioti), Lashina (Tara Strong), and Stompa (voiced by Andrea Romano) and are still mentioned to have been trained by Granny Goodness. Barda also appears, but as having already escaped from Darkseid. There is also a woman named Treasure (loosely based on Precious who was a failed potential recruit to the Furies with the character voiced by April Winchell) is featured briefly. Granny trains Treasure as Big Barda's replacement, but she was swiftly killed by the Female Furies during a test. After being displeased with Treasure's death, Darkseid kidnaps and brainwashes Kara so she will become the captain of the Female Furies.
 The Female Furies appear in DC Super Hero Girls: Intergalactic Games. Their membership consists of Lashina (Jessica DiCicco), Stompa (April Stewart), Mad Harriet (Misty Lee), Artemiz (Teala Dunn), and Speed Queen (Mae Whitman), with Granny Goodness still leading the group.
 Lashina, Mad Harriet, and Artemiz appear in Lego DC Super Hero Girls: Brain Drain with Lashina voiced by Meredith Salenger, Mad Harriet by Jennifer Hale, and Artemiz by Rachael MacFarlane.
 The Furies are featured in the DC Animated Movie Universe:
 In Suicide Squad: Hell to Pay, Knockout is depicted as a former Female Fury who escaped from Apokolips.
 In Justice League Dark: Apokolips War, the Furies are depicted as Wonder Woman, Mera, Hawkman, Starfire and Martian Manhunter robotics and brainwashed under Darkseid's control before being freed.
 The Female Furies were to appear in the cancelled New Gods film.

Video games
 Big Barda, Lashina, Stompa, Mad Harriet, along with Granny Goodness all appear in DC Universe Online.
 Several Female Furies are summonable characters in Scribblenauts Unmasked: A DC Comics Adventure, namely Big Barda, Bernadeth, Lashina, Stompa, Mad Harriet, Artemis, Gilotina, Speed Queen, Bloody Mary, and Wunda.
 The Furies are often referenced by Darkseid during his intro against female opponents in Injustice 2. They are also referenced in Supergirl's legendary multiverse event "Looks Familiar", where Supergirl of Krypton 4128 is the leader of the Female Furies.
 The Female Furies appear in Lego DC Super-Villains, consisting of Lashina (Grey DeLisle), Stompa (Diane Delano) and Mad Harriet (Cree Summer).

Books
 The Female Furies appear in The Dark Side of Apokolips by Laurie S. Sutton published by Capstone as part of their DC Super Heroes line of illustrated children's book. The Furies that appear are Granny Goodness, Lashina, Stompa, Mad Harriet, Bernadeth, Artemiz, and Gilotina.

References

External links
 Cosmic Teams: Female Furies
 DCU Guide: Female Furies 

Comics characters introduced in 1972
2019 comics debuts
New Gods of Apokolips
DC Comics aliens
DC Comics characters with superhuman strength
DC Comics deities
DC Comics demons
DC Comics titles
DC Comics supervillain teams
Characters created by Jack Kirby
Fictional bodyguards
DC Comics female supervillains
Superman characters